Jub Kabud or Joob Kabood, also rendered as Jow Kabud, may refer to:
 Jub Kabud-e Olya
 Jub Kabud-e Sofla